"Hypa Hypa" is a song by German metal and trancecore band Electric Callboy (formerly Eskimo Callboy). The track is the first single from their second EP MMXX. The track gained notoriety in 2021 through its various reissues that the band released in collaboration with other musicians. The song reached number 77 on the German charts.

Genesis and artwork 
The song was written by the band members Daniel Haniß, Kevin Ratajczak, Nico Sallach and Pascal Schillo. Recording and production resulted from the collaboration between Haniß, Ratajczak and Schillo. Haniß was also responsible for mixing the piece himself. The mastering was done by Pitchback Studio, under the direction of the owner Aljoscha Seig.

A screenshot from the accompanying music video can be seen on the front cover of the single. It shows the band in a 1980s style, in front of a convertible, four palm trees and a bright neon pink sun. The artist and song information consists of the inscription: 'Eskimo Callboy starring in Hypa Hypa'. The information is centred at the top of the cover image. Matthias Lowesnstein from Season Zero was responsible for the artwork. The concept came from the band itself. The cover image was first presented on June 4, 2020.

Publishing and promotion 
Hypa Hypa was initially released as a single on June 18, 2020. The single was released as a digital download through the music label Century Media. It was distributed by Sony Music Publishing. On September 11, 2020, the song was released as part of Electric Callboy's second EP MMXX. In the first half of 2021, the band re-recorded the song with some guest vocalists. Some of these new recordings were released in April and May 2021 as singles and some were released as music videos. All singles, like the main track, were released as digital downloads and streaming. The first remix featured the medieval rock band Saltatio Mortis on April 30, 2021. It was followed by a feature from pop singer, Sasha on May 7, 2021. The hip-hop duo 257ers on May 14, 2021. The DJ duo GeStort aber GeiL, the metal singer Axel One, the metalcore band We Butter the Bread with Butter and the country band The BossHoss on May 20, 2021. On May 21, 2021, a new edition of the MMXX album was released called: 'Hypa Hypa edition'. This extended EP includes all the new remixes, as well as the unreleased featuring with guitarist Tobias Rauscher.

To promote the song, the band performed at Wacken World Wide 2020, among other music festivals.

Background information 
Hypa Hypa is the first release from Electric Callboy to feature the new front man Nico Sallach, who was previously the lead singer of trancecore band To the Rats and Wolves. He replaced Sebastian 'Sushi' Biesler, who had left the band after ten years. Biesler announced his departure on February 12, 2020. After leaving the band, he formed Ghostkid.

Content 
The lyrics to Hypa Hypa are in English and a reference to Hyper Hyper by Scooter. The term 'hypa' is a corruption of 'hyper' which comes from the Greek and can be translated as 'mega', 'super' or 'over'. The music and lyrics were originally written and composed by Electric Callboy members Danierl Haniß, Kevin Ratajcak, Nico Sallach and Pascal Schillo. The version with the 257ers contains lyrics in German, and only the chorus was taken over in the original. The two members of the 257ers, Mike Rohleder and Daniel Schneider appear as additional authors. Musically, the song moves in the field of metalcore. The tempo is 76 beats per minute and the key is E major.

Music video 
The music video was shot in Castrop-Rauxel and premiered on YouTube on June 19, 2020. A first teaser was presented on June 4, 2020, when Sallach was officially confirmed as the new lead singer. During the shooting, the band received support from influencers such as _alienxbaby_ or HandOfBlood. The video was shot in the style of the 1980s and uses stylistic devices such as Hawaiian shirts , neon colours or a mullet-Hairstyle. It can be divided into three scenes. First, you see the band playing the song. On the other hand you see _alienxbaby_, who plays with things in an ambiguous way or poses lasciviously in front of a Ferrari convertible. Another scene shows the other influencers dancing to the song. The total length of the video is 3:31 minutes. The Schillo brothers Oliver and Pascal, who also directed VIP and Prism, directed the film. The music video has over 12.9 million views on YouTube to date (as of June 2021).

In addition, music videos for the versions with Sasha (May 7, 2021), 257ers (May 14, 2021), We Butter the Bread with Butter (May 21, 2021) and Axel One (May 25, 2021) have also been released, leading to the for the most part also take up the stylistic devices of the 1980s. Ratajczak and Sallach have guest appearances in all videos; _alienxbaby_ also appears in the videos of the 257ers and Sasha.

Credits

Song production 

 David Friedrich : drums
 Daniel Haniß : mixdown , guitar , composer , songwriter , sound engineer
 Daniel Klossek : Bass
 Kevin Ratajczak : vocals , keyboards , composer, songwriter, sound engineer
 Nico Sallach : vocals, composer, lyricist
 Pascal Schillo : guitar, composer, songwriter, sound engineer
 Aljoscha Sieg : Mastering

Company 

 Century Media : Music label
 Life Lines Edition: Publisher
 Melodies of the World : Publisher
 Sony Music Publishing : Distribution

Cover design 

 Matthias Lowenstein : Artwork

Music video 

 _alienxbaby_: actress
 Florian Berwanger: cameraman
 Electric Callboy : Concepter
 HandOfBlood : actor
 Oliver Schillo: film producer , director
 Pascal Schillo: film producer, director
 Jan Schmidt: camera assistant
 Tim Schuback: Grip
 Patrick Unger: Illuminator
 Kami Zero: hairdresser , makeup

References 

2020 songs